The Waverley Historic District is located in Enid, Oklahoma, and has been listed on the National Register of Historic Places (NRHP) since 2006. It consists of four Waverley additions. The William and Luther Braden farm was the first parcel of land to be platted by the Waverley Development Company in May 1902. Subsequent additions were platted in 1905, 1906, and 1907. The District has 275 buildings built between 1895 and 1935. Architectural styles in the district include Queen Anne cottages, Folk Victorian houses, Colonial Revival houses, Craftsman Bungalow and Prairie School Foursquare Houses. There are also a few Tudor Revival, Neoclassical, Italian Renaissance, and Spanish Eclectic homes.

The T. T. Eason Mansion and the McCristy-Knox Mansion are also located within the district, and were both owned by wealthy oilmen. Both of these mansions were listed on the NRHP in 1987. T.T. Eason of Eason Oil Company purchased his house following original owner John W. Graham's death. Graham had the Prairie Box style house constructed in 1916, and Eason lived in it from 1923 to 1935. Charles E. Knox, who owned a refinery in Covington, Oklahoma, purchased his mansion from Joseph McCristy, president of the Enid Mill and Grain Company. The mansion was built in 1909 in the Neo-Classical style and designed by R.W. Shaw. Knox also owned another site listed on the National Register of Historic Places, the Knox Building. Musician Michael Hedges also lived in the house with his family.

References

Buildings and structures in Enid, Oklahoma
Geography of Garfield County, Oklahoma
Historic districts on the National Register of Historic Places in Oklahoma
Houses on the National Register of Historic Places in Oklahoma
National Register of Historic Places in Garfield County, Oklahoma